Panteleimon "Pantelis" Papaioakeim (alternate spelling: Papaeoakeim) (born 9 September 1975) is a retired Greek professional basketball player. At a height of 2.06 m (6'9") tall, he played at both the power forward and center positions.

Professional career
During his pro career, Papaioakeim played in the top-tier level Greek Basket League, and in the European-wide top-tier level EuroLeague.

National team career
Papaioakeim played with the Greece's under-26 national selection at the 2001 Mediterranean Games, where he won a silver medal.

References

External links 
Euroleague.net Profile
Draftexpress.com Profile
Eurobasket.com Profile
FIBA Europe Profile
Greek Basket League Profile 
Greek Basket League Profile 
Hellenic Federation Profile 
AEK Athens Profile

1975 births
Living people
AEK B.C. players
Centers (basketball)
Competitors at the 2001 Mediterranean Games
Greek men's basketball players
Iraklis Thessaloniki B.C. players
Makedonikos B.C. players
Mediterranean Games medalists in basketball
Mediterranean Games silver medalists for Greece
Olympia Larissa B.C. players
Panellinios B.C. players
Philippos Thessaloniki B.C. players
Power forwards (basketball)
Basketball players from Thessaloniki